The Black Babies  is the first EP recorded by the folk rock artist Devendra Banhart. It was released only in the United Kingdom through Young God's UK distributor, Cargo UK, in 2003.

Track listing

References 

2003 EPs
Devendra Banhart albums
Young God Records EPs